Matt Toka (stage name) is an American musician.  He was lead singer of the band Cherry Monroe.

In 2012, Matt Toka has released an EP produced by Rob Cavallo. Matt Toka followed the release going on Warped Tour and Bamboozle Festival.

Toka has also toured with Falling in Reverse, All American Rejects, and Breathe Carolina.

References

Living people
American rock singers
American multi-instrumentalists
Year of birth missing (living people)
Songwriters from Ohio